Lynn Milgrim (born March 17, 1944) is an American film, television, and stage actress. She was born in Philadelphia, Pennsylvania. She is best known as an accomplished stage actress and has been in numerous Broadway, national, and regional productions. She has also appeared in many feature films, television series, and television movies.

Career

Stage roles  

Broadway roles include: Bedroom Farce as Jan, Otherwise Engaged as Davina, and Charley's Aunt as Amy Spettigue.

Other stage roles include: What Would Jeanne Moreau Do? by Elinor Jones; WIN/LOSE/DRAW at the Provincetown Playhouse, with The New York Times calling her a "delightful actress"; Lynne Meadows's Close of Play; playing Helena (Staff) in William Shakespeare's play A Midsummer's Night Dream at the Actors Theatre of Louisville; playing Celimene in Moliere's play The Misanthrope in the Williamstown Theatre Festival production at the Adams Memorial Theatre Main Stage at Williams College in Williamstown, Massachusetts with Emery Battis; as Mrs. Yang in Bertolt Brecht's play The Good Woman of Setzuan, also at Williams College; as Geraldine Barclay in Joe Orton's play What The Butler Saw, also at Williams College; and playing the mother-in-law in the Bertolt Brecht play The Caucasian Chalk Circle at the South Coast Repertory in Costa Mesa, California; and many more.

More recent productions include: Samuel D. Hunter's Rest and Outside Mullingar by John Patrick Shanley, both also at South Coast Repertory; a revival of Joseph Kesserling’s 1941 Broadway classic Arsenic And Old Lace at La Mirada Theatre in Los Angeles; Christine Deitne's Diana of Dobson's; Eastern Standard at the Coast Playhouse; George Bernard Shaw's Pygmalion at the Pasadena Playhouse, with her performance called "excellent"; Hedda Gabler; and A Doll's House, Part 2.

Television roles 

She has had recurring roles and made guest appearances on major TV shows such as The Doctors,The Wonder Years, Life Goes On, Mama's Family, Knots Landing, Who's the Boss?, Highway to Heaven, CBS Summer Playhouse, The Equalizer

Film roles 

Her film credits include Tell Me That You Love Me, Junie Moon (1970), Enormous Changes at the Last Minute (1983), two Cybill Shepherd movies (Telling Secrets (1993) (TV) and Baby Brokers (1994)

Personal life 
She is married to fellow actor H. Richard Greene. The two had recurring roles as Jim and Evelyn Cooper, Winnie Cooper's parents, on The Wonder Years.

References

External links
 
 Lynn Milgram on IBDB

American stage actresses
American television actresses
American film actresses
American voice actresses